Xenomystax bidentatus is an eel in the family Congridae (conger/garden eels). It was described by Earl Desmond Reid in 1940. It is a marine, tropical eel which is known from northern South America, in the western central Atlantic Ocean.

References

Congridae
Fish described in 1940
Taxa named by Earl Desmond Reid